Nils Edward Josef "Nisse, Molle" Molander (22 June 1889 – 30 January 1974) was a Swedish ice hockey player. He played at the 1920 Summer Olympics and 1924 Winter Olympics and finished in fourth place on both occasions. He also competed at the 1914 European Speed Skating Championships.

References

External links

 

1889 births
1974 deaths
Ice hockey people from Stockholm
Ice hockey players at the 1920 Summer Olympics
Ice hockey players at the 1924 Winter Olympics
Olympic ice hockey players of Sweden
Swedish ice hockey players